武術 or 武术 means martial arts in East Asian languages, and may refer to:

 Bujutsu, meaning Japanese martial arts
 Musul, meaning Korean martial arts
 Võ thuật, meaning Vietnamese martial arts
 Wushu (term), meaning Chinese martial arts
 Wushu (sport), an exhibition and a full-contact sport derived from traditional Chinese martial arts

See also 
 Wushu (disambiguation)